Selisoo Nature Reserve is a nature reserve which is located in Ida-Viru County, Estonia.

The protected area was founded in 2015 to protect valuable habitat types and threatened species in Metsküla village (former Mäetaguse Parish).

References

Nature reserves in Estonia
Geography of Ida-Viru County